After Constantin Bodin's death, fighting among his potential successors weakened the state of Duklja and the region succumbed to Rascia's reign between 1183 and 1186.

In 1190, Grand Župan of Rascia Stefan Nemanja's son, Vukan II, asserted his right to the Dukljan crown. In 1219, the regent of Zeta and King Vukan's oldest son, Đorđe Nemanjić, became king of Duklja/Zeta. He was succeeded by his second oldest son, Uroš I, who built the 'Uspenje Bogorodice' monastery in Morača.

Between 1276 and 1309, Zeta was ruled by Queen Jelena, widow of Serbia's King Uroš I. She restored around 50 monasteries in the region--- most notably Saint Srđ and Vakh on the Bojana River. The name Crna Gora (Montenegro) was formally mentioned for the first time in 1296, in the charter of St. Nicholas' monastery in Vranjina.  This charter was issued by the Serbian King Stefan Milutin Nemanjić, who was the youngest son of Uroš I and Helen of Anjou. Crna Gora (Montenegro) was to be understood as the highland region under Mount Lovćen, within the confines of Zeta. By the beginning of the 14th century, during King Milutin's reign, the Archdiocese in Bar was the strongest feudal lord in Zeta.

From 1309 to 1321, Zeta was co-ruled by the oldest son of King Milutin, Young King Stefan Uroš III Dečanski. Similarly, from 1321 to 1331, Stefan's young son Stefan Dušan Uroš IV Nemanjić, the future Serbian King and Tsar, co-ruled Zeta with his father.

After Tsar Dušan's death in 1355, the Serbian state Kingdom started to crumble and its holdings were divided among Prince (Knjaz) Lazar Hrebeljanović, the short-lived (1353–1391) Bosnian state of Tvrtko I Kotromanić, and a semi-independent chiefdom of Zeta under the House of Balšić, whose founder Balša I came to power in 1356.

Zeta
The region of Zeta was a part of the Serbian Empire reigned by the House of Nemanjić. In the mid-14th century in the Lower Zeta region, a minor nobility family known as the House of Balšić comes to prominence (during the reign of Tsar Dušan; ca. 1360 they have become one of the major nobility groups within the Empire, recognized as such local lords of Zeta under Tsar Uroš. The Serbian Empire becomes ever-fragmented as local lords become acting ever-more independently, the Balsics included; after the Battle of Marica in 1371 emperor Uroš dies and no one succeeds him at the Throne.

In 1421 the Balšić family is succeeded by the House of Lazarević.

House of Balšić
The Balšić family members all had their own lands which they held collectively, but they were at various times presided by a Head of the Family: 
 Balša I (1356–1362)
 Đurađ I (1362–1378)
 Balša II (1378–1385)
 Đurađ II (1385–1403)
 Balša III (1403–1421)

House of Lazarević 
 Despot Stefan Lazarević (1421–1427)

House of Branković 
In 1427 the Serbian despot died and the throne through adoptive lineage passes on to the House of Branković, according to the treaty; they inherit the Zetan territories. The Lazarevic and Brankovic houses use the legitimate right they had succeeded from the Balsics in order to claim supremacy over the Crnojevic house as well, in the Upper Zeta region (Montenegro proper).

In 1456 the last Serbian bastion in Zeta, the fortifications of Medun, are conquered by the Ottoman forces of Sultan Mehmed the Conqueror.

 Despot Đurađ Branković (1427–1456)

House of Crnojević
The House of Crnojević was a dynasty ruling in the Medieval state of Zeta, first struggling with House of Balšić for control over Zeta, and then succeeding them as Zeta's supreme overlords throughout the 14th and 15th century. Since the second half of the 15th century, they would play a crucial role in the survival of late Medieval Zeta. All members of the House of Crnojević considered themselves Lords Zetan.

See also
List of rulers of Duklja
List of rulers of Montenegro

Zeta
 
Rulers of Zeta